Donald G. McPherson (born April 2, 1965) is a former National Football League and Canadian Football League quarterback. He spent seven seasons in the NFL and CFL with the Philadelphia Eagles, Houston Oilers, Hamilton Tiger-Cats, and Ottawa Rough Riders.

He was drafted by the Philadelphia Eagles in 1988 after a college career at Syracuse University during which he won the Maxwell Award, the Davey O'Brien National Quarterback Award and finished second in the 1987 Heisman Trophy voting.  He also played for the Houston Oilers, Hamilton Tiger-Cats and Ottawa Rough Riders. His accomplishments during his tenure at Syracuse propelled him to be inducted into the NCAA College Football Hall of Fame announced on May 1, 2008.

After retiring from football in 1994, McPherson joined the staff of Northeastern University's Center for the Study of Sport in Society, before becoming the first executive director of the Sports Leadership Institute at Adelphi University.  As a feminist and social activist he has founded several outreach and mentoring programs, and regularly speaks at college campuses as a critic of gender roles, stating that the standard constructions of masculinity and femininity both limit men's emotions and overall well-being as well as contribute to "gendered violence" such as domestic violence, stalking, and rape.  In this capacity he has testified before hearings of the United States House of Representatives.

McPherson is currently a college football commentator for Big East football on regional sports cable network SportsNet New York.

He is the younger brother of former NFL player and pastor Miles McPherson.

See also
 List of NCAA major college football yearly passing leaders

References

1965 births
Living people
Adelphi University faculty
African-American players of American football
African-American players of Canadian football
All-American college football players
American football quarterbacks
American social workers
Canadian football quarterbacks
College Football Hall of Fame inductees
Hamilton Tiger-Cats players
Houston Oilers players
Ottawa Rough Riders players
Sportspeople from Brooklyn
Players of American football from New York City
Philadelphia Eagles players
Syracuse Orange football players
African-American feminists
American feminists
Male feminists
College football announcers
21st-century African-American people
21st-century African-American women
20th-century African-American sportspeople
Players of Canadian football from New York (state)